Holta is a small farming village in the municipality of Strand in Rogaland county, Norway. The farm is situated on the northern hills overlooking the lake Bjørheimsvatn.

On 9 August 1961, the Holtaheia Accident took place as a Vickers VC.1 Viking passenger aeroplane, G-AHPM operated by Cunard Eagle Airways, transporting schoolboys from The Archbishop Lanfranc School in Thornton Heath, London, crashed into the mountainside above the farm (Holtaheia). A total of 34 students, two teachers and three crew members were killed.

References

Villages in Rogaland
Strand, Norway